Birir (Kalash Language: Biriu ) is one of the three Kalash Valleys in Chitral District, Khyber Pakhtunkhwa province, Pakistan.

References

External links 

 

Kalasha Valleys
Valleys of Khyber Pakhtunkhwa